Youmou to Ohana (Japanese 羊毛とおはな) were a Japanese acoustic music duo produced by LD&K Records. 
The duo were guitarist "Wool" Youmou (real name Kazunori Ichikawa, born 26 July 1981) and singer "Flower" Ohana (real name Hana Chiba, 31 January 1979 - 8 April 2015).  Their first album in 2007 was sold at Nagoya's Village Vanguard. Following the Great East Japan earthquake Youmou and Ohana’s song ‘Fuyu no Uta’ was used in a TV commercial in Taiwan as a thank-you message by Interchange Association Japan (IAJ) for Taiwan's support after the earthquake. This led to a concert in Taipei.

Discography

Albums

References

Japanese musical groups